The 17th Utah Territorial Assembly convened on January 13, 1868.

Major Legislation

Appropriations
 Territorial Appropriation Bill (February 21, 1868)

Criminal Laws
 An Act concerning Libel (February 21, 1868)

Incorporations of Cities and Counties
 An Act changing the name of Richland County to Rich County (January 29, 1868)*
 An Act changing the name of Great Salt Lake City and Great Salt Lake County (January 29, 1868)
 An Act to incorporate Deseret City, in Millard County (February 3, 1868)
 An Act incorporating the City of Smithfield, in Cache County (February 6, 1868)
 An Act incorporating Richmond City, in Cache County (February 6, 1868)
 An Act incorporating Kaysville City, in Davis County (February 13, 1868)
 An Act incorporating the City of Morgan, in Morgan County (February 13, 1868)
 An Act incorporating Parowan City, in Iron County (February 13, 1868)
 An Act incorporating the City of Ephraim, in Sanpete County (February 14, 1868)
 An Act incorporating Cedar City, in Iron County (February 18, 1868)
 An Act incorporating Franklin City, in Cache County (February 19, 1868)
 An Act changing the County Seat of Morgan County (February 19, 1868)
 An Act incorporating Mount Pleasant, in Sanpete County (February 20, 1868)
 An Act amending the Charters of the Incorporated Cities in the Territory of Utah (February 21, 1868)

Members 
 Francis M. Lyman

References

Utah Territorial Legislature